Stephen the Great, Prince of Moldavia, established a number of Romanian Orthodox churches and monasteries as ktitor. The tradition that he built one after every battle he won is untrue, but he did build certain ones in honor of victories and in memory of his fallen soldiers. Based on the carved inscriptions placed contemporaneously to his reign, Stephen built the following churches, plus an additional two that were added later based on local tradition, without indicating the date of construction. He almost certainly established additional churches (at least seven others are attributed to him), but these are the ones for which there is clear documentation.

References
 Biserici și mănăstiri at the Ștefan cel Mare site of Putna Monastery; accessed October 14, 2012

 
Moldavian style architecture